Ed Daein Airport  is an airport serving the city of Ed Daein, in the East Darfur state of Sudan.

References 

Airports in Sudan